Shigui is a railway station on the Taiwan Railways Administration West Coast line located in Dounan Township, Yunlin County, Taiwan.

History
The station opened on 24 October 1958.

See also
 List of railway stations in Taiwan

References

1958 establishments in Taiwan
Railway stations in Yunlin County
Railway stations opened in 1958
Railway stations served by Taiwan Railways Administration